Anthony Wesly Florence (born December 11, 1966) is a former American football defensive back. He spent two seasons with the National Football League's Tampa Bay Buccaneers, and another season with the Cleveland Browns.

Florence was selected in the fourth round of the 1989 NFL Draft out of Bethune-Cookman, where he was teammates with Terry Williams. The pick was considered a “reach,” and Florence never played a down for the Buccaneers.

See also 
 List of Bethune-Cookman Wildcats in the NFL draft

References 

1966 births
Living people
American football defensive backs
Bethune–Cookman Wildcats football players
Tampa Bay Buccaneers players
Cleveland Browns players